Rānui railway station is located on the Western Line of the Auckland rail network in New Zealand. It serves the communities of Rānui and Pooks Road, in the West Auckland suburb of Rānui.

The station was opened on 16 November 1925.

Services 
Western Line suburban train services, between Swanson and Britomart, are provided by Auckland One Rail on behalf of Auckland Transport.

In 2017 local residents complained about the number of assaults at the station and the threatening characters "hanging around" the station, which led to security staff being stationed there for a period.

Stabling project
As part of upgrades to Auckland's urban rail network, ARTA had proposed building a stabling yard to store up to 11 trains to the west of the station. The yard was to be used to clean trains when out of service, and there were to be staff car parking and welfare facilities. Due to opposition from locals this was abandoned and the stabling yard was moved to Henderson.

See also 
 List of Auckland railway stations

References 

Rail transport in Auckland
Railway stations in New Zealand
Railway stations opened in 1925
Buildings and structures in Auckland
West Auckland, New Zealand